The Expedition is the live album by the American metal band Kamelot, released in October 2000 through Noise Records. The last three tracks are rare studio recordings: "We Three Kings" (instrumental) and "One Day" are additional material from the Siege Perilous sessions, and "We Are Not Separate" is a re-recorded version of a song from the Dominion album.

Track listing
 "Intro" / "Until Kingdom Come"
 "Expedition"
 "The Shadow of Uther"
 "Millennium"
 "A Sailorman's Hymn"
 "New Allegiance" / "The Fourth Legacy"
 "Call of the Sea"
 "Desert Reign" / "Nights of Arabia"
 "We Three Kings"
 "One Day"
 "We Are Not Separate"

Personnel

Band members
 Roy Khan – vocals
 Thomas Youngblood – guitar, backing vocals
 Glenn Barry – bass guitar
 Casey Grillo – drums
 Günter Werno - keyboards

Production
 Recorded by Sascha Paeth from concerts in Germany and Greece April 2000
 Mixed and mastered by Sascha Paeth at Pathway Studios, Wolfsburg, Germany
 Assistants on site: Ralf Schindler, Thomas Kuschewski, Bonni "Q-ryched!" Bilski
 Tracks 9 and 10 recorded in 1998 at Morrisound Studios, Tampa, Florida - engineered By Howard Helm. Keyboards by Howard Helm
 Track 11 recorded in 2000 at Pathway Studios Wolfsburg, Germany - engineered by Sascha Paeth. Keyboards by Miro
 Intro by Hans Zimmer (09.10sec – 10:04sec of "Rocket Away" from the movie soundtrack The Rock)
 Photos by Axel Jusseit, Claudia Ehrhardt, Edwin Van Hoof and Kamelot
 Antique maps: © Photo Essentials
 Artwork and Layout by Maren/Noise Graphics
 Cover photos by Axel Jusseit

References

External links
 Official site

Kamelot albums
2000 live albums